Bouguirat is a town and commune in Mostaganem Province, Algeria. It is the capital of Bouguirat District. According to the 1998 census it has a population of 26,954. It contains the municipal stadium.

References

Communes of Mostaganem Province